Prabhakar Sundarrao More was an Indian politician. He was elected to the Maharashtra Legislative Assembly from Mahad in the 1990, 1995, 1999 Maharashtra Legislative Assembly election as a member of Shiv Sena.

References 

1963 births
2019 deaths
Shiv Sena politicians
Maharashtra MLAs 1990–1995
Maharashtra MLAs 1995–1999
Maharashtra MLAs 1999–2004
People from Raigad district